Rhopalomenia is a genus of solenogasters, shell-less, worm-like, marine mollusks.

Species
Species within the genus Rhopalomenia include:
Rhopalomenia aglaopheniae (Kowalevsky & Marion, 1887)
Rhopalomenia glandulosa Eisenhut & Salvini-Plawen, 2006
Species brought into synonymy
 Rhopalomenia atlantica (Leloup, 1948): synonym of Entonomenia atlantica Leloup, 1948
 Rhopalomenia carinata Salvini-Plawen, 1978: synonym of Entonomenia carinata (Salvini-Plawen, 1978)
 Rhopalomenia cristata Salvini-Plawen, 1978: synonym of Entonomenia cristata (Salvini-Plawen, 1978)
 Rhopalomenia debilis Nierstrasz, 1902: synonym of Strophomenia debilis (Nierstrasz, 1902)
 Rhopalomenia eisigi Thiele, 1894: synonym of Rhopalomenia aglaopheniae (Kowalevsky & Marion, 1887)
 Rhopalomenia indica Nierstrasz, 1902: synonym of Strophomenia indica (Nierstrasz, 1902)
 Rhopalomenia microporata Handl & Salvini-Plawen, 2002: synonym of Entonomenia microporata (Handl & Salvini-Plawen, 2002)
 Rhopalomenia rhynchopharyngeata Salvini-Plawen, 1978: synonym of Entonomenia rhynchopharyngeata (Salvini-Plawen, 1978)
 Rhopalomenia scandens Heath, 1905: synonym of Strophomenia scandens (Heath, 1905)
 Rhopalomenia sertulariicola Salvini-Plawen, 1978: synonym of Entonomenia sertulariicola (Salvini-Plawen, 1978)
 Rhopalomenia tricarinata Salvini-Plawen, 1978: synonym of Entonomenia tricarinata (Salvini-Plawen, 1978)

References

 Simroth, H. (1893). Kritische Bemerkungen über die Systematik der Neomeniiden. Zeitschrift für wissenschaftliche Zoologie. 56: 310-327
 García-Álvarez O., Salvini-Plawen L.v., Urgorri V. & Troncoso J.S. (2014). Mollusca. Solenogastres, Caudofoveata, Monoplacophora. Fauna Iberica. 38: 1-294

Solenogastres